Weird is the seventeenth studio album by American singer-songwriter Juliana Hatfield. It was released on January 18, 2019 through American Laundromat Records. She began working on the record after wrapping up Juliana Hatfield Sings Olivia-Newton-John.  "I had a lot of musical ideas. I went back into the studio and recorded a bunch of music, she said in a 2019 interview about the album. "I took a month or two off to write lyrics. I don’t usually work like that. I usually have full songs written, but I just felt like I wanted to do things a little differently. What emerged was a portrait of my life right now, which is pretty solitary and slightly isolated but not unpleasantly so. I was exploring what it’s like to be alone a lot of the time. It’s not necessarily a bad thing. Sometimes it could be a very good thing."

Track listing

References

2019 albums
Juliana Hatfield albums
American Laundromat Records albums